Grand Slam is the 19th album by The Isley Brothers, released on their T-Neck imprint via CBS Records on March 21, 1981. The album was recorded and mixed digitally.

The album was remastered and expanded for inclusion in the 2015 CD box set The RCA Victor & T-Neck Album Masters, 1959-1983.

Reception

Grand Slam was successful on both the pop and R&B album charts, where it reached #28 and #3, respectively. It eventually went gold after selling 500,000 copies.

Track listing

Personnel
The Isley Brothers
Ronald Isley - lead vocals, background vocals, musical arrangement 
O'Kelly Isley - background vocals, musical arrangement 
Rudolph Isley - background vocals, musical arrangement 
Ernie Isley - background vocals (2), musical arrangement, guitars, drums, percussion 
Marvin Isley - background vocals (2), musical arrangement, bass played by, percussion 
Chris Jasper - background vocals (2), musical arrangement, keyboards, congas, other percussion
Guest Musicians 
Eve Otto — harp (1)
Kevin Jones — congas (1-2, 4-5, 7)
Everett Collins — drums (1, 7)

Charts

Weekly charts

Year-end charts

Singles

References

External links
 The Isley Brothers-Grand Slam at Discogs

1981 albums
The Isley Brothers albums
T-Neck Records albums